The Flag Building, also referred to as the Super Power Building, is the largest building in Clearwater, Florida. It is owned by the Church of Scientology and was built principally to deliver the Super Power Rundown, a high-level Scientology training course intended to train Scientologists to use what Scientology describes as all of their 57 "perceptics" or senses. The interior of the building contains training suites, course rooms, theaters and various devices intended to test these "perceptics," including a "time machine", an anti-gravity simulator, an "infinite" pit, and a pain station.
 
The complex occupies a city block at 215 South Fort Harrison Avenue. It includes a 15-story tower topped by a bronze Scientology cross visible from much of Clearwater. Construction began in 1998, was halted in 2003, and was ultimately resumed to reach substantial completion during 2011. The long delay in construction led to substantial fines being levied by the city authorities. The building is valued at $80 million and at least $145 million was raised by Church fundraising towards the project. The church denies accusations that the Flag Building's completion was deliberately delayed so that it could serve as a cash cow.

The Church of Scientology announced in August 2013 that the building would be opened to the public on October 6, 2013, with a dedication ceremony that the church estimated would attract approximately 10,000 Scientologists. However, a month later it emerged that the Church had canceled the ceremony and postponed the opening of the building. The building finally opened on November 17, 2013.

Purpose
The Church states the Super Power Building provides a dedicated center for delivering the Super Power Rundown, a high-level Scientology training course that has not yet been released. The Super Power Rundown was described by Scientology's founder, L. Ron Hubbard, as

{{blockquote|"A super fantastic, but confidential series of rundowns that can be done on anybody whether Dn [Dianetics] Clear or not that puts the person into fantastic shape unleashing Super Power of a thetan. This means that puts Scientologists into a new realm of ability enabling them to create a new world. It puts world Clearing within reach of the future. This is a parallel rundown to Power in Saint Hill which is taken by the Dn Clear. It consists of 12 separate high power rundowns which are brand new and enter realms of the tech never before approached. Power is still very much in use on the Grade Chart but is for those who didn't go Clear on Dn."<ref>'Dianetics and Scientology Technical Dictionary, p. 413. Bridge Publications, 1989</ref>}}

Hubbard wrote that "Super Power is the answer to a sick, a dying and dead society. With it, we literally revive the dead." A Church of Scientology statement says that "Super Power is a series of spiritual counseling processes designed to give a person back his own viewpoint, increase his perception, exercise his power of choice, and greatly enhance other spiritual abilities." The St. Petersburg Times reports that Scientologist Matt Feshbach, a multimillion-dollar donor who is one of the few who has done Super Power, now feels that he "senses danger faster than most people. He appreciates beauty more deeply than he used to. He says he outperforms his peers in the money management industry." Feshbach says that he has become "a more competent spiritual being. I'm not dependent on my physical body to perceive things."

Perceptics
The Church of Scientology's in-house magazine Source has promoted the program as being aimed "to shift the creation of a new civilization into overdrive". According to Source, "this is the powerful series of rundowns that will move every Scientologist, at any level of The Bridge, into an entirely new realm of ability. It's here one will progress through the drilling stations of the Perceptic Rundown. And when it comes to the future, here's the likes of which has never even been conceived of on this planet." The 57 "perceptics" (senses) covered by the rundown are:

According to the Church of Scientology, the building will contain specially developed equipment which "expand[s] on technology developed by NASA to train astronauts" designed to exercise and enhance an individual's "perceptics". These machines will include such things as an antigravity simulator, a gyroscope-like apparatus that spins a person around while blindfolded to improve perception of compass direction, and a video screen that moves forward and backward while flashing images to hone a viewer's ability to identify subliminal messages. According to Marc Headley, who worked on developing the "perceptics", Scientologists will have to undergo testing on each of them. For Smell, for example, there are "hundreds and hundreds of vials of distinct smells that did not evaporate. You name it, bananas, peppermint, sunflowers, any smell that you can think of, they had it in a vial. Some of the smells were very similar, like oranges, tangerines, orange peel, orange juice, you had to tell the difference and until you could name each and every one correctly, you did not finish this perceptic."

Leaked blueprints of the building's interior include facilities such as a "time machine", an "oiliness table", a "pain station" and an "infinite pit". Scientologists undergoing Super Power training in the building will be "spun on a gyroscope-like wheel, spend time in a sound chamber, sniff vials emitting fragrances and experience changes in gravitational pull." According to Headley, the "insanely loud" anti-gravity simulator was nicknamed the "Barfitron".

Design

At , the building is the largest property in Clearwater. It was originally budgeted to cost $24 million, but the cost has more than doubled to an estimated $50 million after repeated redesigns of the interior. According to the building plans, the Super Power Building will feature a grand lobby lined with sculptures depicting aspects of Scientology; theaters for training and introductory films; a museum honoring the Sea Org; and a separate museum honoring Scientology's founder, L. Ron Hubbard. The sixth floor will house an indoor running track for Scientologists undergoing the Purification Rundown detoxification program. The Mediterranean Revival-style building will also contain a bookstore, a library, and hundreds of course and study rooms; with a total of 889 rooms, 447 windows, and 42 bathrooms, plus an 1,140-seat dining room and two kitchens. A 124-foot (38 m) bridge connects the Super Power Building to the Scientology-owned Fort Harrison Hotel on the other side of S. Fort Harrison Avenue. In January 2012, Tony Ortega of the Village Voice published leaked blueprints of the Super Power Building that revealed architectural features including a recreation of a deck on the Apollo, L. Ron Hubbard's flagship in the 1960s.

Fundraising
The building was financed through a fundraising effort called the "Super Power Expansion Project." A fundraising letter sent to Scientologists in March 2002 described the purpose of the project:

Contributions to the project are on a sliding scale with "titles" that are fancied among adherents awarded as prizes according to the level of donations. These range from the starting level, "Flag Supporter" (a $1,000 donation), to the mid-ranking "Master Builder of Merit" ($500,000) and so on up to the "Legion of OT Meritorious" ($7,500,000). According to a Scientology magazine published in September 2007, Scientologist actress Kirstie Alley is ranked as a "Founding Member" of the project, indicating a $250,000 donation."FLAG Experience". Source Magazine, issue 193, Pages 36-37, September 2007 The actress Catherine Bell has also contributed and is ranked as a "Double Cornerstone Member" (twice the normal "cornerstone" donation of $35,000 - i.e., $70,000). The project's July 2004 "Cornerstone Newsletter", lists 1,218 members contributing a total of just under $89 million; by 2007, the total had risen to over $142 million. Some individual Scientologists have given up to $5 million each. Scientologists contributing to the project are given a number of benefits depending on the level of their contributions, including "gold validation pins" and "Super Power rings", "exclusive membership to the Key Contributor Lounge in the new mecca building created specially for these stellar contributors", and fee reductions or priority status for Super Power courses. "Cornerstone Members" have been promised a 40 percent discount and that their names will be engraved on a plaque inside the building.

A 2011 investigation by the St. Petersburg Times newspaper found that the Church of Scientology had raised at least $145 million from its members for the Super Power Building project, vastly more than the building's ostensible cost. In one week alone, $23 million was raised – almost half the entire cost that had been stated in 2009. Ex-members have complained of being subjected to intensive demands for funds and have suggested that the Church purposefully delayed completing the project so that it would remain a "cash cow", though church spokesmen have strongly denied this. In January 2013, a Californian couple who had donated more than $420,000 to the project sued the Church of Scientology for fraud and deception, charging that the Church had kept the building incomplete "to use it as a shill to induce further payments from members, just as they did the plaintiffs."

Project history

Plans for the Super Power Building project were unveiled in 1993 by the Los Angeles-based Church of Scientology Religious Trust. The site was formerly occupied by the Gray Moss Inn, a turn-of-the-century building across the street from the Scientology-owned Fort Harrison Hotel. The inn had stood empty since being damaged in a 1989 arson fire and the Church of Scientology acquired the land in 1991 after it had been purchased by local property developer Terence J. McCarthy, the owner of T.J.M. Holding and president of Graymoss, Inc.

The architectural firm HOK was hired to deliver the project. Construction officially began by Skanska USA in November 1998 and was slated for completion by late 2003. However, work was reported to have fallen well behind schedule and stopped in 2003. The cost of construction was reported to have more than doubled due to rises in the price of steel and labor, with the Church repeatedly issuing fundraising requests to its members. The revised cost was not disclosed but in 2000 it was reported that the cost had risen from the initial estimate of $24 million to $45 million, and a doubling of this figure would put the total cost at over $90 million. The Church also stated that the building had undergone two major redesigns due to its requirement to "keep pace with the quality of construction at other new facilities". In mid-February 2006, the Church hired Gensler, the world's largest architectural firm, to take over the project.

The erratic progress of the project prompted criticism from local government officials and residents. In 2005, the city's code enforcement board ordered the exterior, including landscaping and sidewalks, to be completed by early summer. Frank Hibbard, the Mayor of Clearwater, noted that "the building had become an eyesore, surrounded by dirt and a chain-link fence." The deadline was not met and daily fines of $250 — totalling over $40,000 by the end of 2006 — were levied against the Church.

A Church spokesman announced in April 2006 that the building would be completed by the end of 2007 but this date has slipped repeatedly. Press reports at the time indicated that the Church was aiming to complete the building by March 2008. In November 2006 the city of Clearwater served the Church with a development order to complete the exterior of the building. but by December 2006 construction had not yet resumed and Church officials indicated that "mid 2008" was now the target date. The prolonged delay has adversely impacted other proposed developments that intended to capitalize on the promised increased economic activity from Scientologists visiting Clearwater. Church officials have offered no public explanation of the delays other than "a recurring need to revise interior design schemes in an effort to get it just right." Work on the building was still at a standstill by March 2009; the daily fines levied by the city then totaled $245,000. Construction work was restarted in July 2009 after the completion of renovation of the nearby Fort Harrison Hotel. Scientology officials stated that the building had cost about $40 million up to that point and that completing the interior was expected to increase the total cost to $50 million. No new completion dates were announced, but "as soon as we get the go-ahead from the city, we'll begin".

In September 2009, Church spokesperson Peter Mansell estimated the Super Power Building would be ready for occupancy by fall of 2010. This date passed without the building opening, though the exterior was completed by 2011. In June 2011, the St. Petersburg Times reported that the building had passed inspection and its Certificate of Occupancy had been obtained. The Church sought to seek a reduction in the fine levied by the city at the Code Enforcement Board's July or August meeting. Church spokeswoman Pat Harney said, "We are simply following the standard procedures to close out any remaining permit issues." According to city assistant planning director Gina Clayton, since 2000 the Church has paid the city, county and state $2.2 million in permit, plan review, impact and other fees. The Church said its redesigns needed time. "We build for eternity," former spokesman Ben Shaw told the Times''. "When we do that, we want it perfect." The Church said it would host a ribbon-cutting and dedication ceremony there later in 2011. It asked the city to reduce its fine by 90 percent, to reflect its "good faith" effort in bringing the building to code, but the city's resident-led Code Enforcement Board, which has a record of leniency and decimating fines, voted unanimously to keep the fines mostly untouched, saying the Church had long ignored the city's rules. The fine was set at $413,500, allowing for a reduction to account for months when the Church's plans were paused by city review.

Over 14 years after construction began and nearly a decade after it had been supposed to open, the Super Power Building had still not been opened. It has been valued at $80 million by county assessors. In August 2013 the Church disclosed that it was planning to open the building on October 6, 2013, with a dedication ceremony expected to draw in an estimated 10,000 Scientologists in attendance. Only a month later, however, the Church told city authorities that it had decided to cancel the ceremony and postpone the opening of the building to an unspecified date, for undisclosed reasons. The building was finally opened on November 17, 2013, with Scientologist stars such as Tom Cruise, John Travolta and Kelly Preston in attendance for a ceremony presided over by Scientology leader David Miscavige. The number of Scientologists attending the ceremony was reported by the local media to have been far lower than the Church had forecast in advance, perhaps below 6,000 people, though the Church asserted in a press release that it had been "slightly over the expected 10,000 people".

References

External links
 Church of Scientology Flag Service Organization
 Google Maps - satellite image of Super Power Building
 New York Times Inside Scientology Slideshow featuring the Flag Building

Scientology properties
Scientology-related controversies
2011 establishments in Florida
Buildings and structures in Clearwater, Florida